KNBL (1260 AM) is a radio station broadcasting a variety hits format. Licensed to Idaho Falls, Idaho, United States, the station serves the Pocatello area. The station is currently owned by Riverbend Communications, LLC.

History
The station went on the air as KIFI in 1947 and changed its call sign to KTEE in 1963. On February 22, 1991, the station changed its call sign to KICN, on November 12, 2001, to KZNI, on May 12, 2004, to KSSL, on April 20, 2006, to KBLY, and on October 21, 2014, to KEIR.

KEIR changed their format from news/talk to Christian radio on October 3, 2016.

On August 1, 2018, the station changed its call sign to the current KNBL.

On September 10, 2018, KNBL changed their format from religious to variety hits, branded as "Cannonball 101".

Previous logo

References

External links

 
 
 
 
 

NBL
Radio stations established in 1947
1947 establishments in Idaho
Adult hits radio stations in the United States